Philydrella is a small genus of flowering plants described as a genus with this name in 1878.

The entire genus is endemic to the southwestern portion of Western Australia.

 Species
 Philydrella drummondii L.G.Adams 
 Philydrella pygmaea (R.Br.) Caruel

References

Commelinales genera
Flora of Western Australia
Philydraceae
Taxa named by Teodoro Caruel